In mathematics, a Sturmian sequence may refer to:

 A Sturmian word: a sequence with minimal complexity function
 A sequence used to determine the number of distinct real roots of a polynomial by Sturm's theorem